Stephen "Stevie" Nicholas (born 8 July 1981, in Stirling) is a Scottish footballer.

Nicholas signed for Motherwell from Stirling Albion in 1999 for £100,000 and made his debut from the bench in a 1–1 draw with Aberdeen at Fir Park on 20 March. He scored his first goal for Motherwell on 15 May that year, scoring a 74th minute consolation in a 5–1 home defeat to Rangers.

Formerly seen as a star of the future at both Motherwell and Stirling Albion injury has since stunted Nicholas' career. He returned to Stirling Albion in 2002 and has since had spells at Alloa Athletic, Partick Thistle, Stranraer, East Fife, Queen's Park and Montrose.

He scored his first Queen's Park goal in a 2–1 loss to Raith Rovers on 6 December 2008.

References

External links 
 
  (current spell at Stirling)

1981 births
Living people
Footballers from Stirling
Scottish footballers
Scottish Premier League players
Scottish Football League players
Association football midfielders
Stirling Albion F.C. players
Motherwell F.C. players
East Fife F.C. players
Northwich Victoria F.C. players
Alloa Athletic F.C. players
Partick Thistle F.C. players
Stranraer F.C. players
Queen's Park F.C. players
Montrose F.C. players
Ballingry Rovers F.C. players